Diodorus of Aspendus was a Pythagorean philosopher, who lived in the 4th century BC, and was an acquaintance of Stratonicus the musician. He was the student or companion of the Pythagorean philosopher Aresas.

Diodorus is said to have adopted a Cynic way of life, "letting his beard grow, and carrying a stick and a wallet."

References
Diogenes Laërtius, vi. 13
Athenaeus, iv. 163c-f
Iamblichus, Vit. Pythag., 36

4th-century BC philosophers
Pythagoreans
Cynic philosophers
Pamphylians